Qihe County is a county in the northwest of Shandong province, People's Republic of China. It is the southernmost county-level division of the prefecture-level city of Dezhou.

Qihe County is subordinate to Dezhou City, located in the northwestern plain of Lu, on the north bank of the Yellow River, facing Jinan across the river. The county governs 2 townships, 11 towns and 2 sub-district offices with a total population of 780,000 and a total area of 1,411 square kilometers. It belongs to the alluvial plain of the lower Yellow River. It has fertile soil, suitable climate and sufficient sunshine.

Qihe is China's most beautiful eco-tourism demonstration city. It is the only China's new energy automobile manufacturing city and China's emerging industrial equipment manufacturing city. Qihe County is also the only one of the top 100 counties in the economically underdeveloped areas of Shandong Province.

Administrative divisions
As 2012, this County is divided to 9 towns and 5 townships.
Towns

Townships

Climate

References

External links
 Official site

Qihe
Dezhou